Michael Joshua Hyam (18 April 1938 – 8 July 2004), styled His Honour Judge Hyam, was a British judge. He was Recorder of London from 1998 until his death.

References 

 https://www.thetimes.co.uk/article/his-honour-judge-hyam-k0hc06ppdgz
 https://www.theguardian.com/news/2004/jul/15/guardianobituaries

1938 births
2004 deaths
Recorders of London
20th-century English judges
21st-century English judges